Tang Wei (born 7 October 1979) is a Chinese actress. She rose to prominence for her appearance in Lust, Caution (2007). She gained acclaim for her leading performances in Late Autumn (2010), Finding Mr. Right (2013), The Golden Era (2014), Long Day's Journey into Night (2018), and Decision to Leave (2022). 

She has received various accolades, including a Cannes Film Festival Award, a Golden Horse Film Festival Award and a Baeksang Arts Award, including a nomination for a BAFTA Award. Tang ranked 70th on Forbes China Celebrity 100 list in 2013, 38th in 2014, 55th in 2015.

Life and career

1979–2005: Early life and career beginnings 
Tang was born in Hangzhou, Zhejiang. She is the only child of a former stage actress and painter. In an interview, she explained that she often travelled around China and learned to paint, adding that she was influenced by her parents. Tang graduated from a local vocational high school in her hometown in 1996, where her teachers described her as "athletic" and a "good student who always did her homework". She had no plans to become famous; she originally aspired to become an archaeologist or lawyer. Tang made the decision to enter the entertainment industry after doing some modelling in 1997 and played a minor role in the TV series Chinese Female Football. She graduated from the Central Academy of Drama where she majored in directing.

Shortly after her university graduation, Tang met Stan Lai during one of his trips to China. He was impressed by the actress, and was quoted as saying, "The number of stars may not be good actors, a lot of good actors may not be good stars, but Tang Wei was fortunate to have done it." He proceeded to recommend her to several directors and was thus cast in more roles, although she was relatively unknown outside her hometown in China at this time. Nonetheless, Tang starred in a TV series, Policewoman Swallow (2004) and a brief university drama, Che Guevara (2004). After working with a more diverse group of actresses, she also appeared in TV dramas Sons and Daughters of the Red Cross (2004), Leaving Seafront Street (2005), East Meets West (2005), Born in the 60s (2006) and Silent Tears.

2006–08: Lust, Caution and ban

In July 2006, Tang was selected from more than 10,000 actresses to appear in Ang Lee's Lust, Caution (2007). Tang plays the film's main character, Wong Chia-chi, inspired by the story of the executed spy Zheng Pingru. Tang learned both Shanghainese and the related Suzhou dialect for her role. After the film premiered, Tang received wider fame throughout and beyond China. She won the Golden Horse Award for Best New Performer and was nominated for the Independent Spirit Award.

Despite her success, China's State Administration of Radio Film and Television (SARFT) ordered a media ban due to Tang's performance of sexual acts in Lust, Caution. All print ads and feature content using Tang were removed, and her endorsements were discontinued. She was set to star in Tian Zhuangzhuang's big-budget period film The Warrior and the Wolf (2009), but was replaced by Maggie Q. In February 2009, during her absence from the movie industry, she was reported to have briefly attended drama classes at the University of Reading in the United Kingdom.

2010–11: Return to the screen 
Tang made her return to the big screen in Crossing Hennessy (2010), a romantic drama by Ivy Ho which revolves around two people who are set up on a blind date by well-meaning relatives, despite the fact that they both have somebody else on their minds. Tang, who plays a simple girl-next-door with a stubborn streak, learned Cantonese for her role. As this was Tang's first film to be shown in China since Lust, Caution, a March 2010 news article quoted her as saying, "Coming to Hong Kong for this premiere, I can see director Ivy and co-star Andy On again. I've been very happy. Now I'm just excited to see the movie. I will be happy if everyone can see my work."

From November 2009 to March 2010, Tang filmed alongside Hyun Bin in Late Autumn (2010), directed by Kim Tae-yong. The film was shot in Seattle, Washington. Tang's performance in Late Autumn, in which she played an inmate who strikes up a relationship with a man, won over South Korean audiences and made her the only non-Korean to win the Baeksang Awards for Best Actress.

In September 2010, it was announced she was to appear in the patriotic tribute film The Founding of a Party. However her scenes were all cut in the theatrical version, allegedly at the request of Mao Zedong's grandson, Mao Xinyu.
In December 2011, she also voiced the character of Pia Sahastrabuddhe in San Geshagua, the Mandarin Chinese dubbed version of the 2009 Bollywood blockbuster film 3 Idiots starring Aamir Khan, which was originally portrayed by Kareena Kapoor.

Tang returned to mainstream cinema with two major films; Speed Angels, a car-racing flick directed by Jingle Ma and Dragon, a martial arts epic directed by Peter Chan. Though Speed Angels was a commercial flop, Dragon was successful and was named the eighth best movie of 2012 according to Time magazine.

2013–present: Career resurgence
In 2013, Tang starred opposite actor Wu Xiubo in the Xue Xiaolu directed romantic comedy Finding Mr. Right. She plays a girl who goes to Seattle to give birth to a child by her wealthy, married boyfriend. The sleeper hit grossed $85 million at the box office in China and Tang received rave reviews for her performance. Shanghai newspaper City Weekend wrote, "The most compelling element of the movie however, is still Tang Wei herself. It is a testament to her on-screen charisma that such a shrill, materialistic, and generally awful character can have the audience rooting for her."

Tang was then cast to play Xiao Hong, a writer known for depictions of hunger and poverty in China during the 1920s and '30s in Ann Hui's biopic The Golden Era, which closed at the Venice International Film Festival. Though the film was highly anticipated prior to its premiere, it received mixed reviews and failed to do well at the box office.

Tang made her English-language film debut in Blackhat, an action thriller co-starring Chris Hemsworth and Wang Leehom, her former cast member on Lust, Caution (2007). She also starred in A Tale of Three Cities, based on the wartime experiences of Jackie Chan's parents.

Tang and Wu then teamed up again to film the sequel to Finding Mr. Right, titled Book of Love. Book of Love was a huge commercial success and became the highest grossing Chinese romantic film of all time.

In 2017, Tang was then cast as the female lead of Long Day's Journey Into Night, directed by Bi Gan. The same year, she announced her return to the small screen in the upcoming historical drama Empress of the Ming.

In 2019, Tang starred in the drama film The Whistleblower directed by Xue Xiaolu.

In 2022, Tang starred in the South Korean mystery-romance film Decision to Leave, directed by Park Chan-Wook. The film received critical acclaim, with Tang's performance being applauded.

Personal life
Tang married South Korean film director Kim Tae-yong in 2014, in the front yard of the home of Ingmar Bergman on the remote Swedish island of Fårö. A formal wedding ceremony was later held in Hong Kong, with only immediate family members as guests. In August 2016, Tang gave birth to their daughter, Summer.

Filmography

Film

Television

Theater

Awards and nominations

Other honors 
 2004 - Miss Universe China finalist
 2007 - Top Chinese fashion figure
 2007 - New York Times listed her as one of the Best 15 Performers in 2007
 2008 - The Annual Independent Critics List #59 of 2008 World's Most Beautiful People
 2008 - Forbes ranked her 18th on the China Celebrity 100 list
 2008 - Japanese magazine Cut placed her in the Top 50 Best Active Celebrities
 2008 - Accepted invitation and appeared at the Cannes Film Festival

References

External links

 Tang Wei at hkmdb.com

1979 births
20th-century Chinese actresses
21st-century Chinese actresses
Actresses from Wenzhou
Alumni of the University of Reading
Central Academy of Drama alumni
Chinese film actresses
Chinese stage actresses
Chinese television actresses
Living people
People with acquired residency of Hong Kong
Best Actress Asian Film Award winners
Best Actress Paeksang Arts Award (film) winners
Chopard Trophy for Female Revelation winners